Vladimir Anatolyevich Maslennikov (born 17 August 1994) is a Russian sports shooter. He won the bronze medal in the men's 10 metre air rifle event at the 2016 Summer Olympics.

References

External links
 

1994 births
Living people
Russian male sport shooters
Olympic shooters of Russia
Shooters at the 2016 Summer Olympics
People from Lesnoy, Sverdlovsk Oblast
Olympic bronze medalists for Russia
Olympic medalists in shooting
Medalists at the 2016 Summer Olympics
ISSF rifle shooters
Shooters at the 2019 European Games
European Games silver medalists for Russia
European Games medalists in shooting
Shooters at the 2020 Summer Olympics
Sportspeople from Sverdlovsk Oblast